The Amber Road was an ancient trade route for the transfer of amber from coastal areas of the North Sea and the Baltic Sea to the Mediterranean Sea. Prehistoric trade routes between Northern and Southern Europe were defined by the amber trade.

As an important commodity, sometimes dubbed "the gold of the north", amber was transported from the North Sea and Baltic Sea coasts overland by way of the Vistula and Dnieper rivers to Italy, Greece, the Black Sea, Syria and Egypt over a period of thousands of years.

Antiquity
The oldest trade in amber started from Sicily. The Sicilian amber trade was directed to Greece, North Africa and Spain. Sicilian amber was also discovered in Mycenae by the archaeologist Heinrich Schliemann, and it appeared in sites in southern Spain and Portugal. Its distribution is similar to that of ivory, so it is possible that amber from Sicily reached the Iberian Peninsula through contacts with North Africa. After a decline in the consumption and trade of amber at the beginning of the Bronze Age, around 2000 BC, the influence of Baltic amber gradually took the place of the Sicilian one throughout the Iberian Peninsula starting around 1000 BC The new evidence comes from various archaeological and geological locations on the Iberian Peninsula.

From at least the 16th century BC, amber was moved from Northern Europe to the Mediterranean area.  The breast ornament of the Egyptian Pharaoh Tutankhamen (c. ) contains large Baltic amber beads. Schliemann found Sicilian amber beads at Mycenae, as shown by spectroscopic investigation. The quantity of amber in the Royal Tomb of Qatna, Syria, is unparalleled for known second millennium BC sites in the Levant and the Ancient Near East. Amber was sent from the North Sea to the Temple of Apollo at Delphi as an offering. From the Black Sea, trade could continue to Asia along the Silk Road, another ancient trade route.

In Roman times, a main route ran south from the Baltic coast (modern Lithuania), the entire north–south length of modern-day Poland (likely through the Iron Age settlement of Biskupin), through the land of the Boii (modern Czech Republic and Slovakia) to the head of the Adriatic Sea (Aquileia by the modern Gulf of Venice).  Along with amber, other commodities such as animal fur and skin, honey, and wax were exported to the Romans in exchange for Roman glass, brass, gold, and non-ferrous metals such as tin and copper to the early Baltic region.  As this road was a lucrative trade route connecting the Baltic Sea to the Mediterranean Sea, Roman military fortifications were constructed along the route to protect merchants and traders from Germanic raids.

The Old Prussian towns of Kaup and Truso on the Baltic were the starting points of the route to the south. In Scandinavia the amber road probably gave rise to the thriving Nordic Bronze Age culture, bringing influences from the Mediterranean Sea to the northernmost countries of Europe.

Known roads by country

Poland
The shortest (and possibly oldest) road avoids alpine areas and led from the Baltic coastline (nowadays Lithuania and Poland), through Biskupin, Milicz, Wrocław, the Kłodzko Valley (less often through the Moravian Gate), crossed the Danube near Carnuntum in the Noricum province, headed southwest past Poetovio, Celeia, Emona, Nauportus, and reached Patavium and Aquileia at the Adriatic coast. One of the oldest directions of the last stage of the Amber Road to the south of the Danube, noted in the myth about the Argonauts, used the rivers Sava and Kupa, ending with a short continental road from Nauportus to Tarsatica in Rijeka on the coast of the Adriatic.

Germany

Several roads connected the North Sea and Baltic Sea, especially the city of Hamburg to the Brenner Pass, proceeding southwards to Brindisi (nowadays Italy) and Ambracia (nowadays Greece).

Switzerland
The Swiss region indicates a number of alpine roads, concentrating around the capital city Bern and probably originating from the banks of the Rhône and Rhine.

The Netherlands
A small section, including Baarn, Barneveld, Amersfoort and Amerongen, connected the North Sea with the Lower Rhine.

Belgium
A small section led southwards from Antwerp and Bruges to the towns Braine-l'Alleud and Braine-le-Comte, both originally named "Brennia-Brenna". The route continued by following the Meuse towards Bern in Switzerland.

Southern France and Spain
Routes connected amber finding locations at Ambares (near Bordeaux), leading to Béarn and the Pyrenees. Routes connecting the amber finding locations in northern Spain and in the Pyrenees were a trading route to the Mediterranean Sea.

Mongolia
Archaeological sources also suggest that routes may have connected Mongolia to Eastern Europe during the Kitan/Liao Period.

Modern usage
There is a tourist route stretching along the Baltic coast from Kaliningrad to Latvia called "Amber Road".

"Amber Road" sites are:
 Mizgiris Amber Gallery-Museum in Nida;
 Amber Bay in Juodkrantė;
 Lithuania Minor History Museum;
 Amber collection place in Karklė, Lithuania;
 Palanga Amber Museum in Palanga;
 Open amber workshop in Palanga;
 Amber museum in Gdańsk; and
 Samogitian Alka in Šventoji.

In Poland, the north–south motorway A1 is officially named Amber Highway.

EV9 The Amber Route is a long-distance cycling route between Gdańsk, Poland and Pula, Croatia which follows the course of the Amber Road.

References

External links

 OWTRAD-scientific description of the amber road in Poland
 Old World Traditional Trade Routes (OWTRAD) Project
 Joannes Richter – "Die Bernsteinroute bei Backnang" (pdf file)

Amber
History of Europe
Transport in Prussia
Prehistoric Lithuania
Prehistoric Poland
Trade routes